Kamil Mieczysław Grabara (born 8 January 1999) is a Polish professional footballer who plays as a goalkeeper for Danish Superliga club Copenhagen and the Poland football national team.

Club career
Grabara joined Liverpool ahead of the 2016–17 season from Ruch Chorzów for £250,000, and was promoted to the first-team squad for the 2018–19 season. He trained regularly with the first-team squad at Melwood and made his maiden senior outing in a pre-season friendly against Tranmere Rovers in July 2018.
On 26 September 2018, Grabara was named on the substitutes' bench for the first time in Liverpool's 2–1 EFL Cup defeat to Chelsea at Anfield. On 6 January 2019, Grabara joined AGF on loan until the end of the season. On 15 July 2019, Grabara joined Championship side Huddersfield Town on a season-long loan deal.

At the end of September 2020, Grabara returned to Danish club AGF on loan for the 2020–21 season.

On 3 July 2021, Grabara joined Copenhagen on a permanent basis, signing a five-year deal with the Danish side. Following his performances for the club both in the Danish Superliga and the UEFA Champions League, in December 2022 Grabara received the "Goalkeeper of the Year" award by local sports magazine Tipsbladet.

International career
Grabara was a first-choice goalkeeper for Poland U21 throughout most of his tenure with the squad, having made his debut against Denmark on 14 November 2017.

He was called-up in the senior Poland for a friendly match with Scotland on 24 March 2022 and the 2022 FIFA World Cup qualification playoff against Sweden on 29 March 2022.

On 1 June 2022, Grabara made his debut for the senior team as a starter in a 2–1 home 2022–23 UEFA Nations League win against Wales.

On 20 October 2022, Grabara was selected by manager Czesław Michniewicz as part of the final squad for the 2022 FIFA World Cup. Grabara did not make a single appearance during the tournament as Poland were eliminated in the Round of 16 by France.

Style of play
Grabara is described as an allround goalkeeper, able to dominate the penalty area, pull off reflex saves, play out from the back and, as he develops, operate as a sweeper.

Personal life
Grabara is from Ruda Śląska, in Southern Poland. He was the second Polish goalkeeper for Liverpool, after the 2005 UEFA Champions League Final hero Jerzy Dudek.

Career statistics

Club

International

Honours
Copenhagen
 Danish Superliga: 2021–22

References

External links
Profile at the F.C. Copenhagen website
 

1999 births
Living people
Sportspeople from Ruda Śląska
Polish footballers
Association football goalkeepers
Poland international footballers
Poland under-21 international footballers
Poland youth international footballers
Ruch Chorzów players
Liverpool F.C. players
Huddersfield Town A.F.C. players
Aarhus Gymnastikforening players
F.C. Copenhagen players
Premier League players
English Football League players
Danish Superliga players
2022 FIFA World Cup players
Polish expatriate footballers
Polish expatriate sportspeople in England
Expatriate footballers in England
Polish expatriate sportspeople in Denmark
Expatriate men's footballers in Denmark